Ahmed Salama (born 5 February 1981) is an Egyptian footballer who plays for Al-Khabourah SC in Oman Professional League.

Club career
Salama enjoyed a successful career at Tersana although it lasted for only one season. He scored 6 league goals in the 2007–08 Egyptian Premier League making him the top scorer of his team in that season beside Ahed Abdel Majeed, who had the same number of league goals. Due to this success, a number of Egyptian clubs expressed their interest in winning his services. It was Haras El-Hodood who eventually announced his signing on a three-year contract with an undisclosed fee in July 2008.

International career
Ahmed Salama was a part of the Egyptian squad that participated in the football competition of 2007 Pan Arab Games held in Egypt. His only goal in the competition was the opening goal against Sudan. The match ended with a 5-0 Egyptian win as Emad Moteb added the other 4 goals.

Honors

Club
Haras El-Hodoud
Egypt Cup: 2008-09, 2009–10
Egyptian Super Cup: 2010

References

External links

Ahmed Salama at Goal.com

Ahmed Salama at FootballTop.com
Ahmed Salama at FootMercato.net

1981 births
Living people
Egyptian footballers
Egypt international footballers
Egyptian expatriate footballers
Association football forwards
Tersana SC players
Haras El Hodoud SC players
Al-Orouba SC players
Wadi Degla SC players
Al-Khabourah SC players
Oman Professional League players